John W. Brown (October 11, 1796September 6, 1875) was an American lawyer and politician from New York, serving two terms in the  U.S. House of Representatives from 1833 to 1837.

Life
Born in Dundee, Scotland in the Kingdom of Great Britain, Brown immigrated to the United States in 1802 with his father, who settled in Newburgh, New York. He attended the public schools and later studied law. He was admitted to the bar in 1818 and commenced practice in Newburgh. He was elected a justice of the peace in 1820.

Congress
Brown was elected as a Jacksonian to the 23rd and 24th United States Congresses, and served from March 4, 1833, to March 3, 1837. Afterwards he resumed the practice of law.

Later career 
He was a justice of the New York Supreme Court (2nd District) from 1850 to 1865, and was ex officio a judge of the New York Court of Appeals in 1857 and 1865. In 1865, he ran on the Democratic ticket for the Court of Appeals but was defeated by Republican Ward Hunt. 

Afterwards he again resumed the practice of law.

Family 
Brown was the father of Charles F. Brown, who served on the New York Supreme Court.

Death 
He was buried in Cedar Hill Cemetery in Newburgh, New York.

References

Sources

Political Graveyard
The New York Civil List compiled by Franklin Benjamin Hough (page 350; Weed, Parsons and Co., 1858)
Court of Appeals judges

Sketches of Some of the Prominent Members of the Orange County Bar, by Walter case Anthony (1917)

1796 births
1875 deaths
People from Dundee
Politicians from Newburgh, New York
Scottish emigrants to the United States
New York Supreme Court Justices
Judges of the New York Court of Appeals
Jacksonian members of the United States House of Representatives from New York (state)
19th-century American politicians
Politicians from Dundee
Members of the United States House of Representatives from New York (state)